Joel Rodríguez may refer to:

 Joel Plata Rodríguez, Spanish gymnast
 Joel Rodríguez (sailor) (born 1997), Spanish sailor
 Joel Rodríguez (diver) (born 1974), Mexican diver